Lucille's Smokehouse Bar-B-Que is a chain of restaurants founded in Signal Hill, California specializing in barbecue cuisine as well as southern and Cajun style meals. The restaurants feature a southern American and Blues theme. The chain has locations in California, Arizona, and Nevada, and is owned by Hofman Hospitality Group.

See also
Hof's Hut
 List of barbecue restaurants
 List of Cajun restaurants
 List of Southern restaurants

References

Barbecue restaurants in the United States
Regional restaurant chains in the United States
Restaurants in California
Companies based in Los Angeles County, California
Signal Hill, California
Restaurants established in 1999
1999 establishments in California
Cajun restaurants in the United States
Southern restaurants